The France men's national under-17 basketball team is the junior national basketball team representing France in international under-17 and under-16 competitions (under age 17 and under age 16) youth competitions. It is administrated by the Fédération Française de Basket-Ball (French Basketball Federation).

U17 World Cup record

See also
 France national basketball team
 France women's national under-17 basketball team
 France national under-19 basketball team
 France national 3x3 team

References

External links

EuroBasket.com – French Men National Team U16/17
Archived records of France team participations

Men's national under-17 basketball teams
National youth sports teams of France